A pencil moustache  is a thin moustache found adjacent to, or a little above the lip. The style is neatly clipped, so that the moustache takes the form of a thin line, as if it had been drawn using a pencil. A large gap is left between the nose and the moustache. The line of facial hair either breaks across the philtrum, or continues unbroken. In some versions, the line of hair extends vertically along the outside of the philtrum before stopping just below the nose, leaving the philtrum unbridged.

Notable persons who have worn pencil moustaches

Popular culture 

The actors Bud Abbott, Errol Flynn, David Niven, Clark Gable, Don Ameche, J. K. Simmons and Leslie Phillips all had pencil moustaches. Musicians such as Little Richard, Sammy Davis Jr., Prince, George Benson, Dave Wyndorf, Chris Cornell and Ron Mael have been associated with the look.  Jimmy Buffett's 1974 song "Pencil Thin Mustache" is a nostalgic celebration of his childhood when such mustaches were more common.

See also
 List of moustache styles
 List of facial hairstyles

References

External links
 

Moustache styles